Joseph Charles DiVito (born September 2, 1945) is a former American collegiate and professional American football quarterback and punter for the Boston College Eagles and the Denver Broncos of the American Football League.

College career
DiVito played at Boston College from 1965–1967. He completed 80 of 180 passes for 1,138 yards, 14 touchdowns, and 6 interceptions. He was a team captain and, in addition to playing quarterback, also played as a punter.

Professional career

Denver Broncos
DiVito was 1 of 8 quarterbacks to try out for the American Football League's Denver Broncos in 1968, including Steve Tensi, Jim LeClair, John McCormick, and Marlin Briscoe. He was named the backup quarterback behind incumbent starter Steve Tensi. After Tensi broke his collarbone, DiVito got his chance to be the Broncos #1 quarterback. He completed only 1 of 6 passes for 16 yards before being replaced by wide receiver/defensive back Marlin Briscoe. He also completed 8 punts for a total of 242 yards and a net average of 30.3 yards per punt.

Hartford Knights
He was cut following the 1969 training camp and signed with the Hartford Knights of the Atlantic Coast Football League in 1970

See also
Other American Football League players, coaches, and contributors

References

1945 births
Living people
Sportspeople from Lynn, Massachusetts
American football quarterbacks
American football punters
Boston College Eagles football players
Denver Broncos (AFL) players